Croft Moraig Stone Circle (also Croftmoraig) is a prehistoric stone circle situated four miles southwest of Aberfeldy, Scotland. It is a scheduled monument.

Location
The stone circle is situated by the side of the A827 road between Aberfeldy and Kenmore. It stands to the northeast of Loch Tay on low ground beneath steep mountainsides.

Description
The stone circle is a complex multi-phase site. The stone circle shows many features typical to the area including a recumbent stone, graded circle-stones, a south-southwest orientation, quartz pebbles and an outer stoney bank. The stones are of dark grey schist.

Excavations
The stone circle was excavated in 1965. It was found to have three phases of construction, the first phase being fourteen timber posts arranged in a horseshoe pattern measuring 8 metres by 7 metres. The mouth of the horseshoe had a post set just inside it, and in the centre of the horseshoe there was a boulder with some burnt bone near it. In the second phase the timber posts were replaced by a horseshoe setting of 8 standing stones, about 8 metres by 6 metres. This was surrounded by a stone bank around 17 metres in diameter. On top of the bank, to the southwest was a two-metre stone with 23 cupmarks on it.  In the third phase a circle of 12 standing stones about 12 metres in diameter was erected around the horseshoe. There was an entrance in the southeast marked by two external stones with two adjacent graves.

Dating evidence was provided by some sherds of pottery from phase 2 of the site, dating to around 2000 BC.

See also 
 Stone circles in the British Isles and Brittany
 List of stone circles

References

External links

Archaeological sites in Perth and Kinross
Stone circles in Perth and Kinross
Scheduled Ancient Monuments in Perth and Kinross